Sweet Thing is the fifth album by jazz saxophonist Boney James, released in 1997. "I Still Dream" features Al Jarreau.

Track listing

Personnel 
 Boney James – soprano saxophone (1, 4, 5, 9), alto saxophone (2, 8), keyboards (2, 6, 8, 9), Yamaha WX7 (2), tenor saxophone (3, 6, 7), Wurlitzer electric piano (4, 5)
 Dan Shea – keyboards (1)
 David Torkanowsky – keyboards (2, 4), additional keyboards (5), vibraphone solo (5), strings (7), acoustic piano solo (9)
 Alex Al – keyboards (3), Nord synth lead (3), bass (3, 4), drum programming (3)
 Jeff Carruthers – keyboards (4), drum programming (4)
 Darrell Smith – keyboards (5, 7), drum programming (5), electric piano (6)
 John Stoddart – keyboards (8)
 Daddy Shakespeare – Moog synthesizer (8)
 Peter White – accordion (9), guitars (9)
 Paul Jackson Jr. – guitars (1, 2, 7, 8)
 Tony Maiden – guitars (4, 5), vocals (4)
 Larry Kimpel – bass (1, 6, 7, 9)
 Lil' John Roberts – drums (1, 6, 7)
 Paul Brown – drum programming (2, 6-9), additional programming (5)
 Lenny Castro – percussion (1, 2, 5, 6, 8)
 Paulinho da Costa – percussion (7, 9)
 Dan Higgins – tenor saxophone (1)
 Bill Reichenbach Jr. – trombone (1)
 Jerry Hey – flugelhorn (1)
 Maxyan Lewis – vocals (4)
 Dee Harvey – vocals (5)
 Al Jarreau – vocals (8)
 Bridgette Bryant-Fiddmont – backing vocals (8)

Arrangements
 Paul Brown (1, 2, 4-9)
 Carl Burnett (2)
 Boney James (2, 4-9)
 Alex Al (3)
 Jeff Carruthers (4)
 Tony Maiden (5)
 Darrell Smith (5, 7)

Production 
 Boney James – producer 
 Paul Brown – producer, recording, mixing
 Dave Rideau – additional engineer, co-mixing (4)
 Dan Shea – additional engineer 
 Erik Zobler – additional engineer 
 Tony Alvarez Jr. – recording assistant 
 Cappy Japngie – recording assistant 
 Charles Nasser – recording assistant, mix assistant 
 Matt Pakucko – mix assistant 
 Stephen Marcussen – mastering at Precision Mastering (Hollywood, California)
 Lexy Brewer – production coordinator 
 Larry Vigon – art direction, design 
 Brian Jackson – design 
 James Minchin III – photography 
 Howard Lowell – management

References

1997 albums
Boney James albums
Warner Records albums